Violets Are Blue may refer to:

 "Violets are blue", a phrase from the traditional rhyme "Roses Are Red"
 Violets Are Blue (1975 film), a 1975 Danish film
 Violets Are Blue (1986 film), a 1986 romance starring Sissy Spacek
 Violets Are Blue (novel), a 2001 novel in the Alex Cross series by James Patterson
 "Violets Are Blue", a 2002 song by The Killing Tree
 "Violets Are Blue", a 2010 extended play by Breezy Lovejoy, a former pseudonym of Anderson Paak

See also
 Violet blue (disambiguation)